Get Money, Stay True is the third studio album by American rapper Paul Wall; it was released on April 3, 2007, by Swishahouse, Asylum Records and Atlantic Records. The album debuted at number 8 on the US Billboard 200 chart, selling 92,000 copies in its first week.

Critical reception

AllMusic editor David Jeffries praised Wall for sticking with the formula he used for his debut album but felt his material can get stale over a lengthy runtime, concluding with, "Slice this worthy follow-up to The Peoples Champ in half and it's a different story, one that justifies Wall's place in the game." Entertainment Weeklys Simon Vozick-Levinson commended the production for making Wall sound credible but criticized his simplistic "elementary rhymes" when put alongside the album's featured artists. Steve 'Flash' Juon of RapReviews saw improvement in Wall's lyrical content and delivery but felt the production throughout the album weakened his charismatic personality.

Track listing

Target edition
The album was released in a double disc set sold exclusively at Target stores. This edition contained a documentary DVD.

Chopped & Screwed Version
 "Break 'Em Off" (featuring Lil Keke)
 "Gimme That"
 "I'm Throwed" (featuring Jermaine Dupri)
 "Get Your Paper Up" (featuring Yung Redd)
 "Everybody Know Me" (featuring Snoop Dogg)
 "Call Me What U Want" (featuring Yung Redd & E-Class)
 "How Gangstas Roll" (featuring Crys Wall)
 "I'm Real, What Are You? / I'm Da Shit
 "On The Grind" (featuring Freeway & Crys Wall)
 "Tonight" (featuring Jon B.)
 "That Fire" (featuring Trina)
 "I Ain't Hard to Find"
 "Bangin' Screw"
 "Slidin' On That Oil" (featuring Expensive Taste & Unique of the Grit Boys)

Charts

Weekly charts

Year-end charts

References

External links
Paul Wall Mashin' The Gas With Money LP, Adding Sandwiches To His Plate
'Mature' Paul Wall Still Raps About Girls, Grills With Mariah, T.I.
Paul Wall - Get Money Stay True album website.

2007 albums
Paul Wall albums
Atlantic Records albums
Albums produced by Jermaine Dupri
Albums produced by Drumma Boy